This event was held on Saturday 26 January 2008 as part of the 2008 UCI Cyclo-cross World Championships in Treviso, Italy.

Ranking

Notes

External links
 Union Cycliste Internationale

Men's junior race
UCI Cyclo-cross World Championships – Men's junior race
2008 in cyclo-cross